The 1904 Connecticut gubernatorial election was held on November 8, 1904. Republican nominee Henry Roberts defeated Democratic nominee A. Heaton Robertson with 54.88% of the vote.

General election

Candidates
Major party candidates
Henry Roberts, Republican
A. Heaton Robertson, Democratic

Other candidates
George A. Sweetland, Socialist
Oliver G. Beard, Prohibition
Timothy Sullivan, Socialist Labor
Joseph Sheldon, People's

Results

References

1904
Connecticut
Gubernatorial